Paramashiva is a 2014 Indian Kannada language drama musical film directed by Mahesh Babu and produced by Anaji Nagaraj. The film stars V. Ravichandran, Saranya Mohan, Vijay Raghavendra and Sakshi Shivanand in prominent roles. The film is about a family bonding between a brother and his sister and the emotional trauma they face as their life moves on.

The film is a remake of Tamil film Samudhiram (2001) with sub-plot borrowed from another Tamil film Simmarasi (1998) - similar to the pattern followed by the 2002 Telugu film Siva Rama Raju. The film, originally slated for a 2011 release, found much delay and released on 12 September 2014, because of the producer's other commitments.

Cast 
 V. Ravichandran as Shiva
 Vijay Raghavendra as Raghu
 Saranya Mohan as Swathi
 Sakshi Shivanand 
 Srujan Lokesh as Chandrashekar
 Yashas as Shankar
 Rekha Vedavyas
 Ramesh Bhat
 Sadhu Kokila

Soundtrack 
All the songs are composed and scored by Arjun Janya.

References

External links 
 "Paramashiva - V Ravichandran-Mahesh Babu- Arjun Janya - Releasing on Sep 12th"
 V Ravichandran’s next Paramashiva in the making

2014 films
2010s Kannada-language films
Indian drama films
Kannada remakes of Tamil films
Films scored by Arjun Janya
Films directed by Mahesh Babu (director)